Ordos may refer to:

Inner Mongolia
Ordos City, Inner Mongolia, China
Ordos Ejin Horo Airport
Ordos Loop of the Yellow River, a region of China
Ordos Plateau or "the Ordos", land enclosed by Ordos Loop
Ordos Desert, in Inner Mongolia
Ordos Mongols, a Mongol tribe that inhabits the Ordos region
Ordos culture, prehistorical culture
Ordos Mongolian, the variety of Mongolian spoken by the Ordos Mongols

Other uses
House Ordos, a fictional organisation in 'Dune' spin-offs
Michal Ordoš (born 1983), Czech football player

See also
 Ordo (disambiguation)

Language and nationality disambiguation pages